Nieuwstraat may refer to:
 Nieuwstraat (Brussels), a street in Brussels
 Nieuwstraat (Kerkrade), a street shared between Kerkrade, Netherlands and Herzogenrath, Germany